Glen Island is a large area of land between the head of the Jubilee River and the River Thames at Boulter's Lock near Maidenhead.

The Grade II listed Glen Island House, a riverside Gentleman's residence (now offices for a paper mill), was built in 1869 for Lt. Gen. Sir Roger Palmer, 5th Baronet. (d.1910), an Irish landowner who took part in the Charge of the Light Brigade.

See also
Islands in the River Thames

References

Islands of the River Thames